Víctor Leandro Cuesta (born 19 November 1988) is an Argentine professional footballer who plays  as a central defender for Botafogo, on loan from Internacional.

Club career

Born in La Plata, Cuesta joined Arsenal Sarandí as a youth player, progressing to the senior team in 2008. Struggling to get first team action, he was loaned to Defensa y Justicia in January 2010, playing at the time in the Nacional B. He made 34 appearances and scored 2 goals during his one-and-a-half-year stint at the club.

Cuesta returned to Arsenal in 2011 and was part of the squad that won the 2012 Clausura, the 2012 Supercopa and the 2012–13 Copa Argentina, being used mainly as a substitute and making 19 appearances over two seasons. In 2013, he was loaned to Huracán and there enjoyed a successful spell, winning the Copa Argentina as a starter.

Independiente
In 2014, after 6 years contracted to Arsenal, Cuesta transferred to Independiente for $1 million.

Internacional
On 2 March 2017 Internacional signed Cuesta from Independiente. The Brazilian club paid a $0.5 million fee for 50% of his rights with 
clauses that could raise the total fee to $2.5 million.

Cuesta was a key member in the 2017 Brazilian Série B campaign, helping Internacional finishing in second place returning to Brazilian top level Série A.

In the following year he was selected to the Bola de Prata and 2018 Série A team of the year.

International career
Cuesta was chosen as the overage player for the Argentina under-23 squad at the 2016 Olympic tournament in Brazil.

In May 2016, he received his first call up to the senior team as a member of the squad for the Copa América Centenario. He made his debut on 27 May 2016, coming off the bench in a 1–0 win against Honduras.

International goals

|-
| 1. || 14 June 2016|| CenturyLink Field, Seattle, United States ||  ||  ||  || Copa America Centenario
|}

Career statistics

Club

Honours
Arsenal de Sarandí
 Primera División: 2012 Clausura
 Supercopa Argentina: 2012
 Copa Argentina: 2012–13

Huracán
 Copa Argentina: 2013–14
Individual
Bola de Prata: 2018
Campeonato Brasileiro Série A Team of the Year: 2018

References

External links
 

1988 births
Living people
Argentine footballers
Argentina international footballers
Argentine expatriate footballers
Association football defenders
Argentine Primera División players
Campeonato Brasileiro Série A players
Campeonato Brasileiro Série B players
Arsenal de Sarandí footballers
Defensa y Justicia footballers
Club Atlético Huracán footballers
Club Atlético Independiente footballers
Sport Club Internacional players
Botafogo de Futebol e Regatas players
Copa América Centenario players
Footballers at the 2016 Summer Olympics
Olympic footballers of Argentina
Expatriate footballers in Brazil
Footballers from La Plata